Fernanda Pérez (born 30 January 1961) is a Colombian former swimmer. She competed in two events at the 1976 Summer Olympics.

References

1961 births
Living people
Colombian female swimmers
Olympic swimmers of Colombia
Swimmers at the 1976 Summer Olympics
Place of birth missing (living people)